Barna (Bearna in Irish) is a coastal village on the R336 regional road in Connemara, County Galway, Ireland. It has become a satellite village of Galway city. The village is Irish speaking and is therefore a constituent part of the regions of Ireland that make up the Gaeltacht.

Irish language

There are 1,500 native Irish speakers in the Barna Electoral Division. According to the 2011 census, 24% of Bearna's locals use Irish as a daily language.

International links

Barna is twinned with Esquibien, Brittany, France.

Population

At the time of the 2011 Census, the total population in this settlement was 1,878, of which males numbered 920 and females were 958. The total housing stock was 772, of which vacant households numbered 98. With an approximate area of 1.89 km2, this settlement has a 2011 population density of 994 persons per km2.

Electoral District

The total population of the Barna Electoral District (ED) designated as 27044 was 3,630, of which males numbered 1,804 and females were 1,826. The total housing stock was 1,363, of which vacant households numbered 142.

Sport
Sports clubs in the Barna area include Barna GAA, which fields gaelic football teams in men's and ladies' competitions. Other clubs in the locality are Galway Bay Rugby Club, Barna hurling club and Barna United association football club. Cormac Folan of Freeport in Barna represented Ireland in Rowing at the 2008 Summer Olympics. Barna Golf Club, two miles north of the village, is a moorland 18-hole golf course.

Townlands of Barna

Most townlands are anglisations of the original Irish language names.

 Forramoyle West (from Na Foraí Maola Thiar)
 Forramoyle East (from Na Foraí Maola Thoir)
 New Village (from An Baile Nua)
 Leaclea (from An Leac Liath meaning ‘the grey flagstone or slab’)
 Seapoint (Rinn na Mara in Irish)
 Ahaglugger (from Ath an Ghlugair)
 Truskey West (from Troscaigh Thiar)
 Truskey East (from Troscaigh Thoir)
 Freeport (An Chéibh in Irish)
 Ballard West (from An Baile Ard Thiar meaning ‘the high village west’)
 Ballard East (from An Baile Ard Thoir meaning ‘the high village east’)
 Lenarevagh (from An Léana Riabhach meaning ‘the brindled or streaked grassland’)
 Knockaunnacarragh (from An Cnocán Carrach)

Notable people
 Cormac Folan (born 1983) - rower who competed in the men's coxless four event at the 2008 Summer Olympics.
 James Hickey (c. 1837 – c. 4 August 1885) - Fenian and Land Leaguer.
 Micheál Ó Droigheaín (1889-1964) – Irish Republican Army brigadier.
 Sarah McInerney (born 1981) - Journalist and Presenter on TV and radio, notable for her work with RTÉ, Newstalk, and the Sunday Tribune amongst others.

References

External links

Irish language 2006 study (PDF)
Parish website for Barna agus na bhForbacha

Gaeltacht places in County Galway
Gaeltacht towns and villages
Towns and villages in County Galway